Formica obscuripes (western thatching ant) is a species of ant in the family Formicidae. It is native to North America. It produces large mounds covered by small pieces of plant material. The number of adult workers per colony may be as high as 40,000. F. obscuripes feeds upon a number of insect species, consumes nectar from homopterous insects they tend, and occasionally eats plant tissue.

Nests

F. obscuripes creates distinct, dome-shaped mounds composed of varying materials found in the nest's surrounding environment. This composition is primarily vegetation and is commonly called "thatch". The mounds are typically constructed in areas devoid of cover to expose the nest to sunlight. The size of these mounds is highly variable and is mostly determined by the age and health of the colony. The height ranges from 1 to 18 inches (15–45 cm), although nests of larger heights are not uncommon, and can extend down to 4 ft (1.2 m) in the ground, with chambers present in both the thatched mound and the soil. The condition of the thatched mound is in a constant state of change due to activities by the ants and changes in the environment.
To prevent plants from shading the nest, the ants may chew off the bark at the base of plants growing on or nearby the mound. Formic acid is then sprayed into the open layer eventually killing and felling the plants.

Supercolonies 
In the Blue Mountains of Oregon, F. obscuripes has demonstrated the capacity for polydomy.  A supercolony in a four-hectare study area near Lehman Hot Springs consisted of 210 active nests with an estimated population in excess of 56 million ants.

References

External links
 
 
 
 
 
 

obscuripes
Hymenoptera of North America
Insects described in 1886